An equaliser (in Commonwealth English) or equalizer (in American English), is a sports term that refers to a goal or run that makes the two teams' scores equal.

For example, if Team A is winning 1-0 and Team B scores a goal, making the score 1-1, then that goal is an equaliser.

According to Sports Illustrated, one of the most significant goals in United States soccer history was an equalizer scored by Abby Wambach: a header goal off a left-footed long-distance cross from Megan Rapinoe in the 122nd minute of play of the 2011 FIFA Women's World Cup quarterfinal in Germany. FIFA called the goal the "greatest Women's World Cup goal."

See also 
 Association football tactics and skills
 Glossary of ice hockey terms
 Glossary of baseball terms

References

Association football terminology
Ice hockey terminology
Baseball terminology